Hair-Trigger Baxter is a 1926 American silent Western film directed by Jack Nelson and starring Bob Custer, Eugenia Gilbert and Lew Meehan.

Cast
 Bob Custer as Baxter Brant
 Eugenia Gilbert as Rose Moss
 Lew Meehan as Mont Blake
 Murdock MacQuarrie as Joe Craddock
 Fanny Midgley as Mrs. Craddock
 Jim Corey as Jim Dodds
 Ernie Adams as Shorty Hillis
 Hugh Saxon as Silas Brant

References

External links
 

1926 films
1926 Western (genre) films
American black-and-white films
Films directed by Jack Nelson
Film Booking Offices of America films
Silent American Western (genre) films
1920s English-language films
1920s American films